Vetlesen is a Norwegian patronymic surname, literally meaning "son of Vetle". It may refer to:

 Arne Johan Vetlesen (born 1960), Norwegian philosopher
 G. Unger Vetlesen (1889–1959), Norwegian shipbuilder
 Hugo Vetlesen (born 2000), Norwegian footballer
 Ingrid Vetlesen (born 1981), Norwegian singer
 Leif Vetlesen (1921–2003), Norwegian sailor and politician
 Vesla Vetlesen (born 1930), Norwegian weaver, trade unionist, writer and politician, and second wife of Leif Vetlesen

See also
Vetlesen Prize, Columbia University award

Norwegian-language surnames
Patronymic surnames